The Harbour explosion occurred in Bergen, Norway on 20 April 1944.

History

The Dutch vessel Voorbode loaded with 273,000 lb of explosives caught fire and exploded by the quay in the center of Bergen Vågen at 08:39. 158 people (including 98 civilians) were killed and some 4,800 wounded. 131 houses were destroyed outright, while 117 were so damaged that they had to be condemned.

Evacuation
Following the explosion 4,260 children were evacuated. Important cultural buildings, including Nykirken, the Customs House, Bryggen, the Rosenkrantz Tower and the Haakon's Hall, were severely damaged, but have later been restored.

Photos

External links 
 Bergen online encyclopedia on the explosion

 Article on the incident by the University of Bergen
 Digitalt fortalt: "Evakueringen" by Åsta Vadset, Bergen byarkiv (accessed 7 April 2011)

Explosions in 1944
20th century in Bergen
Explosions in Norway
1944 in Norway
Maritime incidents in April 1944